The American Rosie MovementTM is an ongoing effort created by Thanks! Plain and Simple, Inc. (“Thanks!”), a nonprofit organization founded in 2005.  “Thanks” involves women who worked throughout America during World War II on a broad range of defense industry jobs that were critical to shortening and winning World War II.

“Thanks!” conducts interviews of these “Rosie the Riveters,” now above their mid-90s.  More important, “Rosies” themselves define their own legacy and works with communities to create projects that leave a lasting record of their lives.  The movement is in three phases.  

Phase I was from 2008 to 2020, to learn how to work with partners to find and work with Rosies, to create projects that inspire people and organizations to honor the Rosie LegacyTM so that many people will learn about the importance of these women by creating music, art, parks, lesson plans, books, events and more.  Thus, people learn about Rosies by doing something that lasts.  

Phase II is from 2020 to 2024 to get people to learn about Rosies by doing projects nationally and internationally. Partners include American University; the cities of Washington, DC; Nijmegen, Netherlands, Huntington, WV; Brunswick, MD; Salt Lake City, UT; Youngstown, OH; and Greensboro, NC; various American Legions, Operation Confidence, and others.  

Phase III will be from 2025 into the future so that people follow the Rosie LegacyTM which is:  To pull together to do highest-quality work to prove that we can face new problems together. 

Standards must be met to receive an award as a Model Rosie Community (or Volunteer).  Thus, those who do an excellent job and receive an award as a model, are expected to continue to help improve the process of pulling together to do highest-quality work to use our freedom wisely and to do this in a cooperative spirit.  

As Rosies die out, the procedure of meeting their legacy should continue.  

Michael Kindred, President of the Board, says, "We're proud that we've accomplished so much on relatively little income.  We are doing what should be done, and the help of many people makes that statement that we can do so much more if we build together, not blame each other."

Overview 
"Thanks!" interviewed the first woman in the WV Rosie the Riveter Project in 2008.  Anne Montague, Vice President and Founder, first hoped to find 15 living West Virginia women who performed critical “home front” jobs during World War II, but “Rosies” were hard to find. A breakthrough came March 29, 2009, when the Charleston Gazette-Mail ran an advertisement with a picture of Montague’s mother, Jessie Jacobs Frazier, headlined, “Help us find our Rosies.”

By January, 2011, 150 women had approached “Thanks!” to tell their stories of work in defense jobs, usually in major cities throughout America, and to do highest quality work. Seeing that many “Rosies” wanted to participate beyond being interviewed, “Thanks!” began to help communities everywhere to find and work with “Rosies” to do projects that assure that their valid legacy will be a guide for today and the future. 

Today, “Thanks!” has: 1) interviewed at least 200 Rosies, produced a documentary film (funded, in part, by the West Virginia Humanities Council); 2) given awards to many Model Rosie Cities, 3) created 20 projects (music, art, lesson plans, procedures for communities follow), 4) partnered with various groups (e.g., arts, labor, schools, veterans, civic organizations, embassies), and 5) held events (with Allied Nations, the Today Show), and 6) has three books in progress. 

Quotes most important to the American Rosie MovementTM are:  
Margaret Meade: "Don't ever think that a small group of committed citizens cannot change the world.  Indeed, it's the only thing that ever has."
Nancy Sipple, a Rosie:  "We pulled together then.  We can do it again.  It's our only hope."
Woody Williams: "We did it together!"

References

Notes

Additional Media Coverage

External links
  Thanks! Plain and Simple, Inc. Official
  The American Rosie Movement's website 
  The WV Rosie the Riveter Project

American women civilians in World War II